Rodriguez Canyon is a steep mountain canyon, in San Diego County, California.

References

Landforms of San Diego County, California